Foy S. Evans (November 7, 1919, in Americus, Georgia – March 14, 2008, in Warner Robins, Georgia) was the 8th mayor of Warner Robins, Georgia (1976–1984) and the founder of the now-defunct Warner Robins Daily Sun local newspaper.
He served as a guest columnist for the Houston Home Journal until 2007, which has succeeded the Sun as the main daily newspaper for Houston County, Georgia. He was also an attorney for his private law firm.

External links

 Houston Home Journal

1919 births
2008 deaths
Mayors of Warner Robins, Georgia
20th-century American politicians